Beanblossom, also spelled Bean Blossom, is an unincorporated community in Jackson Township, Brown County, in the U.S. state of Indiana. The town was named for the nearby Beanblossom Creek, which was in turn named for a person whose surname was Beanblossom.

History
Beanblossom was originally called Georgetown, for George Grove who ran a grist mill in the area and under the latter name was founded in 1833. The first post office in the community was established as Bean Blossom in 1842; the post office was discontinued in 1911.

Geography
The closest town to Beanblossom is Helmsburg, approximately two miles west.

Culture
Bean Blossom is best known as the home of the Bill Monroe Memorial Music Park and Campground, a  wooded campground which for more than 60 years has hosted music performances (mostly country and bluegrass), first at the Brown County Jamboree barn and currently at outdoor stages.  A bluegrass festival (currently called the Bill Monroe Memorial Festival) has been held every June since 1967 and is the longest continuously-running bluegrass festival in the world.

References

External links

Bill Monroe Memorial Music Park & Campground
Bean Blossom - Brown County Jamboree Preservation Foundation
Bean Blossom: The Brown County Jamboree and Bill Monroe's Bluegrass Festivals

Unincorporated communities in Brown County, Indiana
Unincorporated communities in Indiana
1833 establishments in Indiana
Populated places established in 1833